Pigen og drømmeslottet (The Girl and the Dream Castle) is a Danish film from 1974, written and directed by Finn Henriksen. The film was Lisbet Dahl's debut as a film actress.

Plot 
Tine is in love with the young owner of a beautiful castle, Karsten. She has been dreaming about the castle since she was a small child and visiting her auntie, who is a neighbor to the castle. But an evil plot has been made to take the castle from Karsten.

Cast 
 Lisbet Dahl - Tine
 Lars Høy - Karsten Holgersen
 Paul Hagen - Bette Ras
 Karl Stegger - Stub
 Lily Broberg - Berthe
 Joen Bille - Bruno Børgesen
 Anette Karlsen - Sonja
 Karen Lykkehus - Rigmor Vollesen
 Kirsten Rolffes - Emma Holgersen
 Ole Monty - Valdemar Holgersen

References

External links

 Pigen og drømmeslottet (1974) - Officiel trailer on YouTube

1974 films
Danish comedy films
1970s Danish-language films
Films directed by Finn Henriksen